Bagisara rectifascia, the straight lined mallow moth or three-lined bagisera moth, is a species of moth in the family Noctuidae (the owlet moths). The species was first described by Augustus Radcliffe Grote in 1874. It is found in North America.

The MONA or Hodges number for Bagisara rectifascia is 9169.

References

Further reading

External links
 

Bagisarinae
Articles created by Qbugbot
Moths described in 1874

Taxa named by Augustus Radcliffe Grote
Moths of North America